Nova Action is the second niche channel aimed at young, active men in the Czech Republic and the main competitor for MTG's channel Prima Cool. The channel, which launched on July 14, 2012, is owned by Central European Media Enterprises. Its 18-hour daily broadcasts currently reach approximately 95% of the country's 10.5 million people.

Nova Action showcases top foreign series, shows, documentaries, sporting events, and movies that appeal to young male viewers.

The channel is also extending its programming to included highly rated foreign titles as well as gradually delivered, locally produced content relevant to its audience.

TV series & miniseries

Chicago P.D. (all seasons)
Elementary (all seasons)
Kobra 11 (all seasons)
NCIS (all seasons)
Person of Interest (all seasons)
Without a Trace (all seasons)

Documentary series

Storage Wars
Auction Kings
Pawn Stars
Shark Tank
Dragons'Den
Titan Games
Mayday
Shipping Wars
Diesel Brothers
Counting Cars
Declassified
American Restoration
American Pickers
Border Security: Australia's Front Line
Ice Road Rescue

Sporting events
NHL
NBA
Ligue 1
Ligue 2
Major League Soccer
ATP World Tour
DFB-Pokal
MotoGP
Premiership Rugby
Basketball Champions League
Six Nations Championship
Handball-Bundesliga

Logo

External links

Nova Action at LyngSat Address

Television stations in the Czech Republic
Television channels and stations established in 2012
Czech-language television stations
TV Nova (Czech Republic)